The 2014 World's Best Racehorse Rankings, sponsored by Longines was the 2014 edition of the World's Best Racehorse Rankings. It was an assessment of Thoroughbred racehorses issued by the International Federation of Horseracing Authorities (IFHA) in January 2015. It included horses aged three or older which competed in flat races during 2014. It was open to all horses irrespective of where they raced or were trained.

The two best horses were both trained in Japan, with Just A Way finishing a pound ahead of Epiphaneia. Next in the rankings came the European three-year-old colts Australia, Kingman and The Grey Gatsby, the Hong Kong gelding Able Friend and the South African horse Variety Club.

Rankings for 2014
For a detailed guide to this table, see below.

Guide
A complete guide to the main table above.

References

World Thoroughbred Racehorse Rankings
World Thoroughbred Rankings 2014